Malayer, formerly Dowlatabad (also Romanized as Dowlatābād and Daūlatābād), is a city and capital of Malayer County in Hamadan Province, Iran. At the 2006 census, its population was 153,748, in 40,750 families.

The second largest city of the province, Malayer has a reputation for rug weaving and has some popular parks. The biggest and historical park name is seifiyeh. Malayer is located between Hamedan.
This city is one of main centers of furniture industry in Iran.

Notable people
 Mohammad Mohammadi-Malayeri, Iranian historian, linguist, and literary scholar
Enshaallah Rahmati, Iranian philosopher, thinker and translator

Gallery

References

External links

Official website

Populated places in Malayer County
Cities in Hamadan Province